Ta Kitrina Gantia (The Yellow Gloves) is a 1960 Greek comedy film made by Finos Films.  It was directed by Alekos Sakellarios and stars Nikos Stavridis, Mimis Fotopoulos, Maro Kontou and Martha Vourtsi.

Plot

Orestis (Nikos Stavridis) is a jealous husband and always appears to be suspicious of his partner. He stops in a cafe and upon finding yellow gloves belonging to wife Rena (Maro Kontou), he suspects her of cheating. He heads to his house in order to ask Rena if the gloves are hers. The situation is resolved and he is embarrassed to find out that they are not Rena's and that he was enraged over nothing. Before he is calmed down, he suspects Rena of having cheated on him with Moustakias (Mimis Fotopoulos) until it is revealed the gloves belonged to the servant Toula (Martha Vourtsi). The film utilises the classic trope of a jealous partner to drive its storyline.

Cast 
 Nikos Stavridis ..... Orestis Kaligaridis
 Maro Kontou ..... Rena Kaligaridi
 Mimis Fotopoulos ..... Leandros
 Martha Vourtsi ..... Toula
 Giannis Gionakis ..... Brilis
 Pantelis Zervos ..... pub owner
 Niki Linardou ..... Annoula
 Kostas Doukas ..... general Hatziantoniou
 Ivoni Vladimirou ..... Thodora
 Popi Lazou ..... Elli Laskaridou

External links

Ta Kitrina Gantia at cine.gr

1960 films
1960 comedy films
1960s Greek-language films
Finos Film films
Greek comedy films